The following list is a discography of production by Madlib, an American hip hop record producer and recording artist from Oxnard, California. It includes a list of songs produced, co-produced and remixed by year, artist, album and title.

Albums produced

1993

Tha Alkaholiks - 21 & Over 
(Tracks produced with Tha Alkaholiks)
 5. "Turn Tha Party Out" (featuring Lootpack)
 9. "Mary Jane"

1995

Tha Alkaholiks - Coast II Coast 

 1. "WLIX" (featuring Lootpack and Declaime) (produced with Tha Alkaholiks)

1996

OGC - Da Storm 

 15. "Flappin'" (produced with E-Swift)

1997

Tha Alkaholiks - Likwidation 

 5. "Tore Down" (featuring Lootpack)
 7. "Killin' It" (featuring Xzibit)

1999

Lootpack - Soundpieces: Da Antidote 

 All tracks

Declaime - Illmindmuzik 

 All tracks

2000

Slum Village - Best Kept Secret 

 8. "Get It Together" (Madlib Remix)
 9. "The Things You Do" (Madlib Remix)

Cali Agents - How the West Was One 

 5. "Up Close and Personal"

Quasimoto - The Unseen 

 All tracks

Various Artists - Lyricist Lounge 2 

 13. "Da Cipha Interlude" (performed by Punchline, Cobra Red, Planet Asia, Consequence, Menace and Phil the Agony)

2001

Declaime - Andsoitisaid 

 1. "Intro"
 2. Move It
 3. Oxnardbangbreak
 5. Magicalmuzikbreak
 6. The Movement (featuring Lootpack)
 7. Sickman Skit
 8. Asylum Walk
 10. Get'em Skit
 12. Kizumsihtrofdogknaht
 14. Cheebaskit
 17. Andsoitisaid
 18. Beatconductasinsai
 19. Don't Trip (featuring Quasimoto)
 20. Muzikillmind
 21. 2MC Or Not 2MC
 22. Bumptybumplebildamludeotis
 24. Spybreak
 25. Reasons
 26. Unuthafatassdrumple
 28. Dayzend
 29. Last Days and Times
 30. Outro

Yesterdays New Quintet - Angles Without Edges 

 All tracks

2003

Zero 7 - Simple Things Remixes 

 4. "Distractions (Madlib's Ynq Remix)"

Wildchild - Secondary Protocol 

 1. "Intro"
 3. "Hands Up"
 6. "Heartbeat" (featuring Oh No)
 8. "Secondary Protocol"
 9. "Knicknack 2002" (featuring Medaphoar and Percee P)
 11. "Bounce" (featuring Aceyalone, Planet Asia, and Spontaneous)
 13. "Party Up" (featuring Vinia Mojica)
 14. "Operation Radio Raid" (featuring LMNO)
 15. "Feel It" (featuring Medaphoar)

Madlib - Shades of Blue: Madlib Invades Blue Note 

 All tracks

Dudley Perkins - A Lil' Light 

 All tracks

Jaylib - Champion Sound 

 1. "L.A. to Detroit" (produced with J Dilla)
 2. "McNasty Filth" (featuring Frank-N-Dank)
 4. "Champion Sound"
 6. "Heavy"
 8. "The Official"
 10. "The Mission"
 12. "Strapped" (featuring Guilty Simpson)
 15. "Survival Test"
 17. "No Games"
 19. "Ice"

Diverse - One A.M. 

 4. "Ain't Right"

2004

Various artists - Blue Note Revisited 

 7. "Young Warrior" (Madlib Remix of Bobbi Humphrey)

Madvillain - Madvillainy 

 All tracks
 1. "The Illest Villains" (produced with MF Doom)

Lootpack - The Lost Tapes 

 All tracks

Yesterdays New Quintet - Stevie 

 All tracks

Vast Aire - Look Mom... No Hands 

 11. "Look Mom... No Hands / A.S.C.F.D."
 14. "Could You Be?"
 16. "Life's Ill Pt. II (The Empire Striketh)" (featuring Breezly Brewin and Vordul)

Prince Po - The Slickness 

 2. "Too Much"
 7. "The Slickness"
 9. "Bump Bump" (featuring Raekwon)

Monk Hughes & The Outer Realm - A Tribute to Brother Weldon 

 All tracks

De La Soul - The Grind Date 

 4. "Shopping Bags (She Got from You)" (featuring Daniel Wallace)
 10. "Come On Down" (featuring Flava Flav)

Oh No - The Disrupt 

 2. "Right Now"
 5. "Stomp That, V. 2" (featuring Wildchild)
 11. "Every Section" (featuring Cornbread)
 13. "My Aggin"
 16. "Chosen One"

DJ Rels - Theme for a Broken Soul 

 All tracks

Declaime - Conversations With Dudley 

 13. "Signs" (featuring Wildchild)
 14. "Enjoy Your Stay"
 15. "Life"

MF DOOM - Mm.. Food 

 4. "One Beer"

2005

Living Legends - Classic 

 3. "Blast Your Radio"

Quasimoto - The Further Adventures of Lord Quas 

 All tracks

The Free Design - The Now Sound Redesigned 

 2. "Where Do I Go"

Lawless Element - Soundvision: In Stereo 

 9. "High"

Sound Directions - The Funky Side of Life 

 All tracks

2006

Dudley Perkins - Expressions (2012 A.U.) 

 All tracks

Danger Doom - Occult Hymn 

 7. "Space Ho's" (Madlib remix)

Prince Po - Prettyblack 

 3. "Mecheti Lightspeed"

J Dilla - The Shining 

 5. "Baby" (featuring Madlib and Guilty Simpson) (produced with J Dilla)

The Visionaries - We Are the Ones (We Have Been Waiting For) 

 13. "Need to Learn" (featuring Rakaa Iriscience, Brother J, YZ, RBX, and Sadat X)

Subtitle - Terrain to Roam 

 1. "H.H. Jesus"
 15. "H.H. Lucifer"

AG - Get Dirty Radio 

 1. "Frozen"
 3. "Take a Ride" (featuring Party Arty and Aloe Blacc)

Ghostface Killah - More Fish 
 7. "Block Rock"

2007

Talib Kweli and Madlib - Liberation 

 All tracks

Planet Asia - Jewelry Box Sessions: The Album 

 7. "Master Builder" (featuring Flii Stylz)

Skyzoo - Corner Store Classic 

 8. "Close Reach" (featuring Nina B)

Yesterdays New Quintet - Yesterdays Universe 

 All tracks

Talib Kweli - Eardrum 

 1. "Everything Man" (featuring Res)
 7. "Eat to Live"
 9. "Soon the New Day" (featuring Norah Jones) (produced with Eric Krasno)

Strong Arm Steady - Deep Hearted 

 6. "Clean Up" (featuring Black Thought and Saukrates)

Wildchild - Jack of All Trades 

 3. "Puppet Masters" (featuring Prince Po)
 9. "The League" (featuring Special Ed, Masta Ace, Percee P, and MC Lyte)
 14. "Eyes Wide Shut" (featuring Oh No and MED)

Percee P - Perseverance 

 All tracks

Guilty Simpson - Stray Bullets 

 1. "The Future"

2008

Erykah Badu - New Amerykah Part One (4th World War) 

 2. "The Healer"
 4. "My People"
 11. "Real Thang"

Guilty Simpson - Ode to the Ghetto 

 1. "The American Dream"
 3. "She Won't Stay at Home"
 8. "The Future" (featuring MED)
 9. "Pigs"
 13. "Yikes"

Jackson Conti - Sujinho 

 All tracks (produced with Ivan Conti)

Madlib - WLIB AM: King of the Wigflip 

 All tracks
 10. "Heat" (performed by Madlib) (produced with Karriem Riggins)

2009

Mos Def - The Ecstatic 

 3. "Auditorium" (featuring Slick Rick) (produced with Mos Def)
 4. "Wahid"
 11. "Pretty Dancer"
 13. "Revelations"

MF DOOM - Born Like This 

 5. "Absolutely"

Slum Village - Villa Manifesto EP 

 4. "Money Right"

2010

Strong Arm Steady - In Search of Stoney Jackson 

 All tracks

The Last Electro-Acoustic Space Jazz & Percussion Ensemble - Miles Away 

 All tracks

Erykah Badu - New Amerykah Part Two (Return of the Ankh) 

 6. "Umm Hmm" (produced with Erykah Badu)
 10. "Incense" (featuring Kirsten Agresta)

Young Jazz Rebels - Slave Riot 

 All tracks

Guilty Simpson - O.J. Simpson 

 All tracks

Das Racist - Shut Up, Dude 

 16. "Deep Ass Shit (You'll Get It When You're High)" (produced with MF Doom)

Vinnie Paz - Season of the Assassin 

 10. "Aristotle’s Dilemma"

2011

Strong Arm Steady - Arms & Hammers 

 11. "Cheeba Cheeba (Part 2)"

Red Hot AIDS Benefit Series - Red Hot + Rio 2 

 B5. "Banana" (with Joyce Moreno featuring Generation Match)

M.E.D. - Classic 

 3. "Too Late"
 6. "Get That" (featuring POK)
 7. "JWF"
 8. "Roll Out" (featuring Kurupt and Planet Asia)
 9. "Blaxican"
 10. "Outta Control" (featuring Hodgy)
 11. "Flying High"
 12. "Medical Card"
 13. "1 Life 2 Live"
 14. "Mystical Magic"

Planet Asia and Madlib - Cracks in the Vinyl 

 All tracks

2012

Georgia Anne Muldrow - Seeds 

 All tracks

Capital Steez - AmeriKKKan Korruption 

 1. "Capital STEEZ"

Captain Murphy - Du∆lity 

 6. "Children of the Atom" (produced with Flying Lotus)

2013

MED, Blu and Madlib - The Burgundy 

 "Burgundy Whip"
 "The Arrangement"
 "Belly Full"

Blu - York 

 14. "Jazzmen"
 15. "Ronald Morgan" (featuring Edan)

Quasimoto - Yessir Whatever 

 All tracks

Roc Marciano - The Pimpire Strikes Back 

 2. "The Sacrifice"

Dudley Perkins - Dr. Stokley 

 11. "State of Emergency"

2014

Snoop Dogg - That's My Work Volume 3 

 10. "Cadillacs"

Freddie Gibbs and Madlib - Piñata 

 All tracks

2015

MK Asante - Buck: Original Book Soundtrack 

 5. "Blank Page"

Ransom - Soul Killa 

 11. "Knicks" (featuring Action Bronson, Freddie Gibbs, and Joey Bada$$)

M.E.D, Blu and Madlib - Bad Neighbor 

 All tracks

Wiki - Lil Me 

 1. "WikiFlag"

2016

Anderson Paak - Malibu 
 3. "The Waters" (featuring BJ the Chicago Kid)

Kanye West - The Life of Pablo 

 17. "No More Parties in LA" (featuring Kendrick Lamar)

J Dilla - The Diary 

 5. "The Shining, Pt. 2 (Ice)"
 15. "The Sickness" (featuring Nas)

2017

Mach-Hommy and Tha God Fahim - Dollar Menu 3: Dump Gawd Edition 

 12. "Sous Vide"

M.E.D, Blu and Madlib - The Turn Up 

 All tracks

2019

MED and Guilty Simpson - Child of the Jungle 

 1. "Mad"

Freddie Gibbs and Madlib - Bandana 

 All tracks

Westside Gunn - Flygod Is An Awesome God 

 5. "Ferragamo Funeral"
 11. "Gunnlib"

2020

The Professionals - The Professionals 

 All tracks

Hus Kingpin & Roc 'C' - The Hidden Painting 

 3. "Scrimmage" (featuring Fashawn)
 6. "Crush"

Pink Siifu & Fly Anakin - FlySiifu's 

 18. "Time Up"

2021

Madlib - Sound Ancestors 

 All tracks

Declaime and Madlib - In the Beginning, Vol. 1 

 All tracks

Westside Gunn - Hitler Wears Hermes 8: Side B 

 5. "Richies"

2022

Fly Anakin - Frank 

 11. "No Dough"

Wildchild - Omowale 

 2. "Manifestin" (featuring Angelo Arce)

Fatlip and Blu - Live From the End of the World, Vol. 1 (Demos) 

 4. "Gangsta Rap"

Black Star - No Fear of Time 

 All tracks

Westside Gunn, Stove God Cooks, and Estee Nack - Peace "Fly" God  

 6. "Derrick Boleman"
 7. "Horses on Sunset"
 8. "Open Praise"

Declaime and Madlib - In the Beginning, Vol. 2 

 All tracks

Sonnyjim and The Purist - White Girl Wasted 

 5. "Does Mushrooms Once"

Freddie Gibbs - $oul $old $eparately 

 14. "CIA"

Mr. Muthafuckin' eXquire - I Love Y.O.U Cuz Y.O.U Ugly Vol. 1  

 4. "Bubbleguts"
 10. "The Weight of Water Part 2"

Open Mike Eagle - Component System with the Auto Reverse 

 5. "Circuit City" (featuring Video Dave and Still Rift)

Loyle Carner - Hugo 

 3. "Georgetown" (featuring John Agard)

Your Old Droog - The Yodfather 

 5. "Droogie-La"

References

Discographies of American artists
Hip hop discographies
Production discographies